Jnan Pujari is an Assamese writer who was awarded with Golden Lotus Award in the section National Film Award for Best Book on Cinema in 49th National Film Awards. 

In 2016, he was awarded the Sahitya Akademi Award for his poetry-collection named Meghmalar Bhraman. He was born in 1948 and post-graduated in Assamese from Dibrugarh University.

References

1948 births
Date of birth missing (living people)
Place of birth missing (living people)
Living people
Dibrugarh University alumni
Indian male writers
[[Recipients of the Sahitya Akademi Award in Assamese]]